The 1978 National Soccer League was the second season of the National Soccer League, the former top-tier Australian professional soccer league, since its establishment in 1977. The premiers were West Adelaide.

Teams

Stadiums and locations
Note: Table lists in alphabetical order.

League table

Results

Finals series
The top four teams in the league entered a playoff series, however the winner of the grand final match was not considered the overall winner of the NSL season, unlike other NSL grand finals.

Individual awards
Player of the Year: Ken Boden (Newcastle KB United)
U-21 Player of the Year: Ian Souness (Eastern Suburbs)
Top Scorer(s): Ken Boden (Newcastle KB United – 14 goals) Clive Eaton (Western Suburbs – 14 goals)
Coach of the Year: Gary Chaldi (Eastern Suburbs)

Notes

References
OzFootball Archives - 1978 NSL Season table
OzFootball Archives - 1978 NSL Season results

1977
1
Aus